Kalix Municipality is a municipality in Norrbotten County in northern Sweden. Its seat is located in Kalix.

In 1924 Töre Municipality was detached from Nederkalix Municipality, forming a municipality of its own. In 1967 the two units were reunified, and the present municipality was created.

History
In historical times, Kalix was the name of the court district (Swedish: domsaga) Kalix Lower Court District. It covered two parishes: Nederkalix and Överkalix (litterally Lower Kalix and Upper Kalix, respectively). The chalice on the coat of arms was present in the Nederkalix coat of arms in 1800, and was incorporated into that of Kalix Municipality in 1989. The choice of symbol originates from the similarity between the Latin root of chalice, calix, mug (itself borrowed from Greek kalyx, κάλυξ, shell, husk) and the local Sami pronunciation of Gáláseatnu, an ancient name for the Kalix River.

Localities
There are twelve localities (or urban areas) in Kalix Municipality:

The municipal seat in bold

Elections

Riksdag
These are the results of the elections to the Riksdag since the 1972 municipal reform. Norrbotten Party also contested the 1994 election but due to the party's small size at a nationwide level SCB did not publish the party's results at a municipal level. The same applies to the Sweden Democrats between 1988 and 1998. "Turnout" denotes the percentage of eligible voters casting any ballots, whereas "Votes" denotes the number of actual valid ballots cast.

Blocs

This lists the relative strength of the socialist and centre-right blocs since 1973, but parties not elected to the Riksdag are inserted as "other", including the Sweden Democrats results from 1988 to 2006, but also the Christian Democrats pre-1991 and the Greens in 1982, 1985 and 1991. The sources are identical to the table above. The coalition or government mandate marked in bold formed the government after the election. New Democracy got elected in 1991 but are still listed as "other" due to the short lifespan of the party.

Language
The traditional Swedish vernacular in Kalix is the Nederkalix dialect. It is not mutually intelligible with Standard Swedish, by which it has been largely replaced as the main language of the municipality. Finnish and Meänkieli are recognized minority languages in Kalix.

Sport

Kalix BF is playing in the top tier of Swedish bandy, Elitserien. The municipality has two other bandy clubs, Karlsborgs BK and Nyborgs SK.

Sister city
Kalix Municipality has one sister city:
 Pielavesi, Finland

Notable natives
Peter Eriksson, politician

See also
List of islands of the Kalix archipelago
Marahamnen

References

External links

Kalix Municipality - Official site
Article Kalix - Nordisk familjebok 

Municipalities of Norrbotten County
Kalix